Sula may refer to:

Places

Norway 
 Sula (island), an island in Sula municipality, Møre og Romsdal county
 Sula, Møre og Romsdal, a municipality in Møre og Romsdal county
 Sula, Solund, an island in Solund municipality, Vestland county
 Ytre Sula (Solund), an island in Solund municipality, Vestland county
 Sula, Trøndelag, an island group in Frøya municipality, Trøndelag county
 Indre Sula and Ytre Sula, two mountains in Surnadal municipality, Møre og Romsdal county

Other locations 
 Sula, Iran, a village in Ardabil Province, Iran
 Sula, Montana, a census-designated place in the United States
 Sula Island, an island in the Philippines
 Sula Islands Regency, Indonesia
 Sula (Dnieper), a tributary of the Dnieper in Ukraine
 Sula (Mezen), a tributary of the Mezen in northern Russia
 Sula (Pechora), a tributary of the Pechora in northern Russia
 Sula Sgeir, an island group in Scotland
 San Pedro Sula, a city in Honduras

People

Given name 
Sula Benet (1903–1982), Polish anthropologist
Sula Bermúdez-Silverman (b. 1993), American multimedia artist
Sula Matovu (b. 1992), Ugandan association footballer
Sula Miranda (b. 1963), Brazilian singer, television presenter and writer
Sula Wolff (1924–2009), British psychiatrist

Surname 
Dashnor Sula (b. 1969), Albanian politician
Din Sula (b. 1998), Belgian association footballer
Dmytro Sula (b. 1994), Ukrainian association footballer
Erik Šuľa (b. 1995), Slovak association footballer
Erion Sula (b. 1986), Albanian association footballer
Hannes Sula (1894–1955), Finnish-Canadian revolutionary and journalist
Ion Sula (b. 1980), Moldovan politician
Jessica Sula (b. 1994), Welsh actress
Karel Šula (b. 1959), Slovak shot putter
Lambert Suła  (d. 1071), Polish bishop
Samuel Suľa (b. 2000), Slovak association footballer
Sofia Sula (b. 2002), Finnish figure skater

Other uses
 Sula (bird), a genus of seabirds
 Sula (novel), a 1973 novel by Toni Morrison
 Sula (brand), a Honduran fruit juice brand
 SulA, an SOS response protein
 Sula, a 1969 children's novel by Lavinia Derwent, with three sequels
 Sula II, a boat that ran trips to the island bird sanctuaries off North Berwick, Scotland
 Caroline Sula, a character in Dread Empire's Fall, a space-opera trilogy
 Sula Vineyards, a winery in the Nashik region of India

See also
 Sulla, an early Roman consul and dictator